The Viaduct Events Centre is a stand-alone, multi-purpose events centre built on the Halsey Street extension wharf, Wynyard Quarter of Auckland, New Zealand. It was owned and operated by Regional Facilities Auckland, an organisation under the control of Auckland Council. Opened in August 2011 at a cost of approximately $32 million, 
the  facility offered eight separate rooms suitable for a wide range of events including conferences, gala dinners and exhibitions.

Since opening, it hosted major events, most notably the New Zealand Fashion Week. The centre was also usually busy with numerous corporate functions, dinners and conferences. Several schools had also chosen the centre for their annual ball.

The Viaduct Events Centre was closed and was converted to be the home base of Emirates Team New Zealand in their defence efforts for the 36th America's Cup presented by Prada and run by The Royal New Zealand Yacht Squadron.

The Viaduct Events Centre is to reopen in April 2023 under the ownership of Auckland Conventions, Venues & Events which is a council controlled organisation, Tātaki Auckland Unlimited.

References

External links 
Viaduct Events Centre

Convention centres in New Zealand
Buildings and structures in Auckland
Tourist attractions in Auckland
Cultural infrastructure completed in 2011
Event venues established in 2011
2010s architecture in New Zealand
Auckland CBD